Kim Ji-woong (born December 14, 1998), is a South Korean actor, singer and model. He is a former member of the South Korean boy group INX and made his debut as an actor in the web series The Sweet Blood (2021). He is best known for his roles in Kissable Lips (2022) and Roommates of Poongduck 304 (2022). He is also known for participating in Mnet's reality competition series Boys Planet.

Early life 
Kim Ji-woong was born on December 14, 1998, in Wonju, Gangwon-do, South Korea. He is a graduate from Pyongwon Middle School.

Career

2016–2018: Debut, disbandment, and lawsuit against his agency 
Kim made his debut as a singer in 2016 as a member of the South Korean boy group, INX, under the stage name Ji-nam. The group disbanded at the end of 2017 and in 2018, they filed a lawsuit against their agency asking for their exclusive contract to be terminated under claims of mistreatment. The Seoul District Court favored the group in the verdict, voiding the contract between them and their agency.

2020–present: Acting debut and Boys Planet 
Kim won the first rank in the male category in the 2020 Burn Up: Challenge to Billboard. After winning, he released the single "Sick of Love" together with Kim Min-jung, who placed first in the female category.

In 2021, Kim landed his first leading role in the Naver TV's web series The Sweet Blood, which is adapted from the webtoon "The Sweet Girl (달달한 그녀)".

In 2022, Kim landed his first leading role in a BL web series Kissable Lips. Kim then acted in the web series Roommates of Poongduck 304 which is based on a novel by Noh Ga-jeong. The series gained a significant amount of attention and ranked 1st for the BL genre on the South Korean streaming service "Watcha."

On December 29, 2022, Kim was unveiled as a contestant on Mnet's reality-survival show Boys Planet.

On March 19, 2023, singer Holland announced on his personal social media accounts that he will be collaborating with Kim on a song titled "Number Boy" for his newest album of the same name which will be released on March 30, 2023.

Discography

Singles

As a featured artist

Soundtrack appearances

Filmography

Film

Web series

Television show

References

External links 
  

1998 births
Living people
K-pop singers
South Korean male idols
21st-century South Korean male singers
21st-century South Korean male actors
South Korean male film actors
South Korean male dancers
South Korean male web series actors
Boys Planet contestants